The Canadian Respiratory Journal  is a bimonthly peer-reviewed medical journal. It publishes original research and news dealing with respiratory disease, sleep medicine, critical care, and thoracic surgery as well as continuing medical education and practice guidelines. It was the official journal of the Canadian Thoracic Society, the Canadian Critical Care Society and the Canadian Sleep Society from 1993 to January 1, 2016 however, its association with these organizations ended when it was purchased from its original publisher, the Pulsus Group by the Hindawi Publishing Corporation.

References

External links 
 

Multilingual journals
Pulmonology journals
Bimonthly journals
Publications established in 1994
Hindawi Publishing Corporation academic journals